Čukarički Stadium, also known as Stadion na Banovom brdu (English: Banovo Brdo Stadium) is a multi-purpose stadium in Belgrade, Serbia. It is currently used mostly for football matches and is the home ground of FK Čukarički. The stadium has a seating capacity of 4,070. As of 2013 the stadium is under reconstruction after which the planned seating capacity for the finished stadium is 8,000 seats.

References

External links
Site of Čukarički

Football venues in Serbia
Multi-purpose stadiums in Serbia
Čukarica